Lightning Love is a 1923 silent comedy film featuring Oliver Hardy.

Cast
 Larry Semon - Larry, a Suitor
 Kathleen Myers - Rhea
 Oliver Hardy - Oliver, the Other Suitor (as Babe Hardy)
 Spencer Bell - Butler
 Al Thompson - Father
 William Hauber
 Pete Gordon
 Elma the Monkey

See also
 List of American films of 1923

References

External links

1923 films
1923 short films
American silent short films
American black-and-white films
1923 comedy films
Films directed by Larry Semon
Silent American comedy films
American comedy short films
1920s American films